This is a list of notable music artists who have recorded one or more songs written and recorded by Colombian singer-songwriter Shakira. Many artists started covering her songs as early as the 2000s. These versions are recorded in different styles and some in another language. 

According to journalist Ana Bejarano, Shakira has been the soundtrack of an entire generation, focusing its impact on Colombian society at the time. According to Billboard, Shakira's songs can range from heartbreaking ballads to "pop anthems." 

Songs like "Whenever Wherever" and "Hips Don't Lie" which were Shakira's biggest hits worldwide are the most covered while the most covered song in Spanish is "Ojos Así" by various artists from countries outside the continent and being used as a soundtrack for Middle Eastern movies. Artists like Li Yuchun were discovered thanks to a cover of Shakira performed on talent shows in the early 2000s.

Selected list

See Also 
 Shakira discography
 List of songs recorded by Shakira

References 

Shakira
Shakira